KFF Mitrovica, commonly known as Mitrovica is a women's football club based in Mitrovica, Kosovo. The club play in the Kosovo Women's Football League, which is the top tier of football in the country.

History

In the 2017–18 season they were crowned champions for the first time in the club's history.

Stadium
The club plays its home games in three stadiums as in:
Adem Jashari Olympic Stadium, a multi-purpose stadium in Mitrovica, Kosovo. The stadium has a capacity of around 35,000 people or 18,500 seated and is named after the one of the founders of the Kosovo Liberation Army, Adem Jashari.
Riza Lushta Stadium, a multi-purpose stadium in Mitrovica, Kosovo. The stadium has a capacity of 12,000 people all seater and is named after the KF Trepça's former player Riza Lushta.
Xhevat Jusufi-Xheki Synthetic Stadium, a football stadium in Mitrovica, Kosovo. The stadium is named after the Lushta Football School's former youth player Xhevat Jusufi.

Honours

Players

Current squad

Personnel

KFF Mitrovica in Europe
KFF Mitrovica will compete in the UEFA Women's Champions League for the first time in the 2018–19 season, entering at the qualifying round. On 7 August 2018, KFF Mitrovica made his debut on UEFA Women's Champions League with a 1–6 away defeat against MTK Hungária.

On 7 August 2019, KFF Mitrovica won their first ever match in UEFA Women's Champions League by defeating Olimpia Cluj, 1–2 and became the first Kosovan side to win a UEFA Women's Champions League match. KFF Mitrovica after completing the qualifying round with three wins, secured the qualification for the round of 32, where he will face the German giants VfL Wolfsburg.

Notes and references

Notes

References

External links
 
KFF Mitrovica at Soccerway

Association football clubs established in 2014
Football clubs in Kosovo
Women's football clubs in Kosovo
Sport in Mitrovica, Kosovo